The 2017–18 season was Cagliari Calcio's second season back in Serie A after being relegated at the end of the 2014–15 season. The club competed in Serie A, finishing 16th, and in the Coppa Italia, where they were eliminated in the fourth round.

Players

Squad information
.

Transfers

In

Loans in

Out

Loans out

Pre-season and friendlies

Competitions

Serie A

League table

Results summary

Results by round

Matches

Coppa Italia

Statistics

Appearances and goals

|-
! colspan=14 style="background:#000080; color:#FF0000; text-align:center| Goalkeepers

|-
! colspan=14 style="background:#000080; color:#FF0000; text-align:center| Defenders

|-
! colspan=14 style="background:#000080; color:#FF0000; text-align:center| Midfielders

|-
! colspan=14 style="background:#000080; color:#FF0000; text-align:center| Forwards

|-
! colspan=14 style="background:#000080; color:#FF0000; text-align:center| Players transferred out during the season

Goalscorers

Last updated: 20 May 2018

Clean sheets

Last updated: 20 May 2018

Disciplinary record

Last updated: 20 May 2018

References

Cagliari Calcio seasons
Cagliari